Amara Konaté (born 3 September 1990) is an Ivorian footballer who plays as a forward for Serie D club ACD San Tommaso.

Football career
Born in Kongasso, Konaté joined Parma FC's academy at the age of 19. He never appeared officially for the senior side, however, being successively loaned to Lega Pro Seconda Divisione clubs Crociati Noceto, Fondi Calcio and Polisportiva Nuovo Campobasso Calcio and being released in 2013.

References

External links

1990 births
Living people
Ivorian footballers
Association football forwards
Parma Calcio 1913 players
Crociati Noceto players
A.S. Roma players
Lleida Esportiu footballers
S.S. Racing Club Fondi players
S.S.D. Città di Campobasso players
S.S.D. Puteolana 1902 Internapoli players
Cavese 1919 players
Serie D players
Segunda División B players
Ivorian expatriate footballers
Expatriate footballers in Italy
Expatriate footballers in Spain
Ivorian expatriate sportspeople in Italy
Ivorian expatriate sportspeople in Spain
People from Woroba District